Jerry Buttimer (born 18 March 1967) is an Irish Fine Gael politician who has served as Cathaoirleach of Seanad Éireann since December 2022. He has served as a Senator for the Labour Panel since 2016, and previously from 2007 to 2011. He served as Leas-Chathaoirleach of Seanad Éireann from July 2020 to August 2020, Leader of the Seanad from 2016 to 2020 and Leader of Fine Gael in the Seanad from 2016 to 2020. He served as a Teachta Dála (TD) for the Cork South-Central constituency from 2011 to 2016.

Early life and education
After early education in Cork, Buttimer studied for the priesthood for six years at St Patrick's College, Maynooth as a candidate for the Diocese of Cork and Ross. He was ordained in 1991 and is a classmate of Bishop Fintan Monahan of Killaloe. After a short period in parish ministry he left for further study and worked as a teacher in a secondary school and more latterly was Director of Adult Education at Ballincollig Community School.

Political life
He was first elected to Cork City Council in 2004 and was an unsuccessful candidate at the 2007 general election for the Cork South-Central constituency, but was subsequently elected to the Seanad. He was Fine Gael Seanad spokesperson on Community, Rural and Gaeltacht Affairs in the 23rd Seanad.

He was critical of the 2012 boundary commission report, which transferred the areas of Bishopstown and Glasheen from the Cork South–Central constituency to Cork North-Central. Both areas were considered his political base in the constituency. Despite predictions that he would move to Cork North-Central at the next election, he announced in August 2012 that he would contest the next election in Cork South-Central.

He lost his seat at the 2016 general election. After his election as a member of Seanad Éireann in April 2016, he was appointed by the Taoiseach as Leader of the Seanad and Leader of Fine Gael in the Seanad. He was an unsuccessful candidate for Cork South-Central at the 2020 general election. He was re-elected to the Seanad in 2020. He was appointed Leas-Chathaoirleach of Seanad Éireann on 7 July 2020.

Golfgate
Following his involvement in the Oireachtas Golf Society scandal ("golfgate"), Buttimer resigned as Leas-Cathaoirleach on 21 August 2020. Buttimer and 80 others attended a golf function and dinner the previous day. At the time it was suggested it was in breach of government COVID-19 guidelines. Buttimer's role in the matter was heavily criticised, as previously Buttimer has been highly critical of those he perceived as not keeping to government guidelines. In April 2020 he had accused broadcaster Ivan Yates of "irresponsible behaviour", telling him that public health measures were "about saving lives... not socialising". In June, he had suggested Donnchadh Ó Laoghaire was "happy to abandon public health advice".

Buttimer also lost the party whip as part of his sanction. The party unanimously voted to restore the whip to Buttimer in January 2021.

Cathaoirleach
He was elected as Cathaoirleach on 16 December 2022.

Personal life
In April 2012, Buttimer came out as gay, the first Fine Gael TD to do so, saying: "I am a TD who just happens to be gay – it is just one little composition of the story that is me and I will continue to be the politician I was yesterday." He married Conchobar Ó Laoghaire in December 2017.

He was the first chair of Fine Gael LGBT.

References

External links

Jerry Buttimer's page on the Fine Gael website

1967 births
Living people
Alumni of University College Cork
Alumni of St Patrick's College, Maynooth
Fine Gael TDs
Fine Gael senators
Gay politicians
Irish schoolteachers
LGBT conservatism
LGBT legislators in Ireland
Local councillors in Cork (city)
Members of the 23rd Seanad
Members of the 25th Seanad
Members of the 26th Seanad
Members of the 31st Dáil